Kevin Neville Lala (formerly Kevin Neville Laland; born 5 October 1962) is an English evolutionary biologist who is Professor of Behavioural and Evolutionary Biology at the University of St Andrews in Scotland. Educated at the University of Southampton and University College London, he was a Human Frontier Science Program fellow at the University of California, Berkeley before joining the University of St Andrews in 2002. He is one of the co-founders of niche construction theory and a prominent advocate of the extended evolutionary synthesis. He is a fellow of the Royal Society of Edinburgh and the Society of Biology. He has also received a European Research Council Advanced Grant, a Royal Society Wolfson Research Merit Award, and a John Templeton Foundation grant. He was the president of the European Human Behaviour and Evolution Association from 2007 to 2010 and a former president of the Cultural Evolution Society. Lala is currently an external faculty of the Konrad Lorenz Institute for Evolution and Cognition Research.

Cognition and learning 
The Lala Lab is primarily focused on animal social learning, innovation, and intelligence, as well as human evolution, particularly the evolution of cognition and culture. Their work lies at the interdisciplinary interface of evolutionary biology, animal behavior, ecology, and psychology.

Niche construction theory 
Following John Odling-Smee's attempt in 1988 to formalize the process of niche construction as an evolutionary process, Odling-Smee, Lala, and Marcus W. Feldman developed a theoretical framework – Niche Construction Theory – that models niche construction as an evolutionary process reciprocally interacting with the process of natural selection. This theory has been applied widely across multiple fields, including ecology evolutionary developmental biology, and human and cultural evolution.

Extended evolutionary synthesis 
In the mid-2010s, Kevin Lala, Tobias Uller, and colleagues pushed for an extended evolutionary synthesis in a series of high-impact articles. From 2015 to 2018, Uller and Lala led a large international John Templeton Foundation grant to test key hypotheses and assumptions of the extended evolutionary synthesis.

Anti-racism work 
Kevin Lala previously served on the Equality, Diversity and Inclusion division of the School of Biology as deputy director. He is currently serving as an anti-racism advocate, publishing articles on racism in academia.

Publications

Journal articles 

 Google scholar

Books 
 Evolutionary Causation: Biological and Philosophical Reflections, The MIT Press, 2019, Tobias Uller, Kevin N Laland 
 Darwin's Unfinished Symphony: How Culture Made the Human Mind, Princeton University Press, 2017 
 Social Learning: An Introduction to Mechanisms, Methods, and Models, Princeton University Press, 2013, William Hoppitt and Kevin N. Laland 
 Sense and nonsense: Evolutionary perspectives on human behaviour, Oxford University Press, 2011, Kevin N. Laland and Gillian R. Brown, 2nd edition 
 Niche Construction: The Neglected Process in Evolution, Princeton University Press, 2003, John Odling-Smee, Kevin N. Laland, Marcus W. Feldman 
 Sense and nonsense: Evolutionary perspectives on human behaviour, Oxford University Press, 2002, Kevin N. Laland and Gillian R. Brown, 1st edition

References

External links
Faculty page
The Lala Lab
Niche construction resource website
Extended evolutionary synthesis project website

Living people
1962 births
Alumni of University College London
Alumni of the University of Southampton
Academics of the University of St Andrews
British evolutionary biologists
Fellows of the Royal Society of Edinburgh
Fellows of The Society of Biology
Royal Society Wolfson Research Merit Award holders
European Research Council grantees
English biologists
Extended evolutionary synthesis
English people of Parsi descent